The Peer Gynt Prize or the Peer Gynt Award (Årets Peer Gynt or Per Gynt-prisen) is a private Norwegian prize presented annually by the private commercial company Peer Gynt AS during the Peer Gynt Festival, also organised by the same company. The Peer Gynt Prize is named after the main character in Peer Gynt (1867), a five-act play in verse by Norwegian dramatist Henrik Ibsen. The prize is awarded to people or institutions who have marked themselves in a positive way nationally and internationally. However, the prize has received criticism for misrepresenting the Peer Gynt character, who is portrayed in Ibsen's play as quintessentially immoral and selfish.

The Peer Gynt Prize has been awarded every year since 1971. The recipient of the annual prize is chosen by the private company Peer Gynt AS and is given to a person or institution that has achieved distinction in society and contributed to improving Norway's international reputation in the company's view. It was first awarded to Einar Gerhardsen for his efforts as prime minister in rebuilding the country after World War II.

Members of the Peer Gynt Festival itself, parliamentary representatives and former winners of the year's Peer Gynt prize may propose candidates for the award.  Former award-winners form a network connected to the Peer Gynt Festival. The award is a bronze statuette of Peer Gynt riding a reindeer buck (Peer Gynt-statuetten), made by artist Carl Bilgrei.

The Peer Gynt Prize award ceremony takes place during the Peer Gynt Festival  (Peer Gynt-stemnet) at Vinstra in Gudbrandsdalen, one of Norway's leading festivals. Peer Gynt Festival is a 12-day cultural festival that takes place in the beginning of August each year. The first Festival was held in 1928, for the centennial of Henrik Ibsen's birth.

Prize winners
 1971: Einar Gerhardsen, former Prime Minister
 1972: Per Aabel, actor
 1973: Liv Ullmann, actress
 1974: Erik Bye, singer and artist
 1975: Erling Stordahl, singer and advocate for disabled persons
 1976: Øivind Bergh, conductor
 1977: Birgit and Rolf Sunnaas, founders of Sunnaas Hospital 
 1978: Arve Tellefsen, violinist
 1979: Grete Waitz, marathon runner
 1980: Anne-Cath. Vestly, author
 1981: Cato Zahl Pedersen, disabled sportsperson
 1982: Jens Evensen, diplomat, lawyer and politician
 1983: Thorbjørn Egner, author and artist
 1984: Crown Princess Sonja
 1985: Bobbysocks, winners of the Eurovision Song Contest
 1986: Annie Skau Berntsen, nurse and missionary
 1987: a-ha, musical group
 1988: Oslo Philharmonic Orchestra
 1989: Norwegian Olympic Committee, Ole Sjetne
 1990: Thorvald Stoltenberg, politician and United Nations official
 1991: Hans-Wilhelm Steinfeld, journalist
 1992: Bjørn Dæhlie and Vegard Ulvang, cross-country skiers
 1993: Kjetil André Aamodt, alpine skier
 1994: Mona Juul and Terje Rød Larsen, diplomats
 1995: Johann Olav Koss, speed skater and founder of Right To Play
 1996: Jostein Gaarder, author
 1997: Gro Harlem Brundtland, United Nations official and former Prime Minister
 1998: Norway women's national handball team, Marit Breivik
 1999: Thor Heyerdahl, ethnographer and adventurer
 2000: Bellona Foundation environmental organization
 2001: Knut Vollebæk, politician and diplomat
 2002: Eva Joly, lawyer against corruption
 2003: Åsne Seierstad, journalist and author
 2004: Arne Næss, philosopher and mountaineer
 2005: Jan Egeland, diplomat and United Nations official
 2006: Kjell Inge Røkke, entrepreneur
 2007: Leif Ove Andsnes, pianist
 2008: Snøhetta AS, international architecture company
 2009: Ole Gunnar Solskjær, footballer and UNICEF ambassador
 2010: Dissimilis Norway
 2011: Magnus Carlsen, chess player
 2012: Marit Bjørgen and Jens Stoltenberg
 2013: Jo Nesbø, author and musician
 2014: Norway Cup, one of the world's largest football tournaments
 2015: May-Britt Moser and Edvard Moser, scientists and Nobel Prize winners in 2014
 2016: Deeyah Khan, film director, music producer, composer and human rights defender.
 2017: Julie Andem, director, screenwriter and television producer
 2018: Elisabeth Hoff, nurse, humanitarian aid worker in Syria 2012–2019
 2019: Kjetil Jansrud and Aksel Lund Svindal, alpine skiers
 2020: Maja Lunde, author
 2021: Birgit Skarstein, paralympic athlete
 2022: Maren Lundby, ski jumper

References

External links
 The Peer Gynt Festival Official website

Norwegian awards
Awards established in 1971
Peer Gynt